Tyquendo Tracey (born June 10, 1993 in Trelawny, Jamaica) is a Jamaican professional athlete competing in the sprints.  He is the 2018 Jamaican champion in the 100 m and the 2018 NACAC champion, setting the championship record of 10.03 s in the process. Just three weeks earlier, he became the 135th man and 20th Jamaican to break the 10-second barrier by running 9.96 s in a qualifying heat at the London Anniversary Games on July 21, 2018. Later that same day, he did it a second time, running 9.98 s in the finals. Tracey later anchored the Americas team to victory in the  relay at the 2018 Continental Cup.

Tracey went to Garvey Maceo High School before enrolling at the Jamaican University of Technology in 2012. He joined the MVP Track Club where former 100 m world record holder Asafa Powell trains, coached by Stephen Francis. However, despite a successful 2018 season he was asked to leave before the year ended. He now trains in the U.S. under the tutelage of coach Rana Reider.

Statistics
Information from World Athletics profile unless otherwise noted.

Personal bests

100 m seasonal bests

International championship results

National titles
Jamaican Championships
100 m: 2018, 2021

Notes

References

External links

1993 births
Living people
Jamaican male sprinters
IAAF Continental Cup winners
Jamaican Athletics Championships winners
People from Trelawny Parish